Justine Michelle Andrews (née Cain; born 17 November 1987) is an English actress,  best known for her roles Charlie in Some Girls from 2012 to 2014 and Carly in Edge of Heaven in 2014.

Filmography

References

External links
 

Living people
1987 births